Willem Cornelis Nicolaas "Wim" Kieft (born 12 November 1962) is a Dutch former professional footballer who played as a centre forward. Kieft went into punditry in 2001, occasionally appearing on football talk show Voetbal Inside

A prolific goal-scorer whose main asset was his heading ability, he played for two big clubs, Ajax and PSV. He also played in Italy and France.

Kieft played for the Netherlands national team, and was a member of the squad that won Euro 1988. He also represented his nation at the 1990 World Cup.

Club career

Born in Amsterdam, Kieft started his professional career with local AFC Ajax, making his first-team debuts on 4 May 1980 at not yet 18. Amongst his youth teammates were Frank Rijkaard, John van 't Schip, Marco van Basten and Gerald Vanenburg, as in his first two full seasons he scored at an astonishing rate, especially in 1981–82 when he netted 32 goals in as many games, being crucial as the team lifted the Eredivisie title and receiving the European Golden Boot award.

At only 20, Kieft was sold to Italy's Pisa Calcio, scoring only three times in a relegation-ending campaign. He did help the Tuscany side immediately promote to Serie A, but underperformed overall in the top flight, with that club and his following, Torino FC.

In the summer of 1987, Kieft returned to his country and signed for PSV Eindhoven. His impact was immediate as his new team won the treble, including the season's European Cup where he scored in the penalty shootout defeat of S.L. Benfica (0–0 after 120 minutes). En route to these accolades he contributed with more than 30 goals overall, 29 alone in the league, a competition-best; he was also one of five European players to ever achieve the feat of winning four competitions – three with their club and one with the national team – in the same year, the others being teammates Berry van Aerle, Hans van Breukelen, Ronald Koeman and Vanenburg.

Kieft had his second and last abroad experience in 1990, joining FC Girondins de Bordeaux from France and again underachieving, returning to PSV and playing three more seasons until his retirement, averaging more than 11 goals in his second spell with the latter. In total, he scored 158 times in only 264 matches in the Netherlands' top division.

Kieft rejoined PSV in 2009, being named assistant coach of the club's youth sides.

International career
Kieft earned his first cap for the Netherlands in 1981. He would represent the national team in three major international tournaments, UEFA Euro 1988, the 1990 FIFA World Cup and Euro 1992.

In the first competition, Kieft played three times for the eventual champions, always as a second-half substitute: on 18 June 1988, after having replaced Erwin Koeman, he scored in the 82nd minute of the 1–0 group stage win against the Republic of Ireland, through a header, helping the Dutch overtake their opponents in the match and finish second in Group 2 to secure a place in the semi-finals.

Kieft played four times in the second tournament, held in Italy, starting against a familiar opponent, Ireland, and finding the net in the 1–1 draw against Egypt as the Oranje exited in the round-of-16.

Post-retirement career and personal life
After retiring, Kieft worked as a football pundit for television channels Sport1 and RTL, making a name for himself as a commentator and pundit with popular football talkshow Voetbal Inside (VI). In 2016, Kieft signed an exclusive agreement with Ziggo Sport. Because of this, he initially could not feature at the VI table. At the end of 2018, Kieft returned twice a week as a table guest at VI. In 2019, Kieft signed a three-year contract with Talpa, which meant that he returned to their new program, Veronica Inside, with the same concept as VI. 

His son, Robbin (born 1987), was also a footballer. After attending Ajax and FC Groningen's youth academies, he played exclusively in the lower leagues of the country.

In his biography, published in 2014, Kieft admitted a long-lasting addiction to alcohol and cocaine, which began after the end of his career and ended after a withdrawal treatment.

Honours

Ajax
 Eredivisie: 1979–80, 1981–82, 1982–83
 KNVB Cup: 1982–83; runner-up: 1979–80, 1980–81

Pisa
 Serie B: 1984–85
 Mitropa Cup: 1985–86

PSV
 Eredivisie: 1987–88, 1988–89, 1991–92
 KNVB Cup: 1987–88, 1988–89, 1989–90
 Johan Cruijff Shield: 1992; runner-up: 1991
 European Cup: 1987–88

Netherlands
 UEFA European Championship: 1988

Individual
 Eredivisie top scorer: 1981–82, 1987–88
 European Golden Boot: 1982
 UEFA Cup Top scorer: 1986–87

References

External links
Beijen profile 

1962 births
Living people
Footballers from Amsterdam
Dutch footballers
Association football forwards
Eredivisie players
AFC Ajax players
PSV Eindhoven players
Serie A players
Serie B players
Pisa S.C. players
Torino F.C. players
Ligue 1 players
FC Girondins de Bordeaux players
Netherlands international footballers
UEFA Euro 1988 players
UEFA Euro 1992 players
1990 FIFA World Cup players
UEFA European Championship-winning players
Dutch expatriate footballers
Expatriate footballers in Italy
Expatriate footballers in France
Dutch expatriate sportspeople in Italy
Dutch expatriate sportspeople in France
Dutch association football commentators